Limonium pectinatum is a species of flowering plant in the family Plumbaginaceae, native to the Canary Islands.

References

pectinatum
Flora of the Canary Islands